You Know I Know may refer to:
You Know I Know (band), a Canadian rock band formerly known as "Inward Eye" 
You Know I Know (album), a 2018 album by English musician Olly Murs
"You Know, I Know", a song by John Lee Hooker from No Escape from the Blues: The Electric Lady Sessions
"You Know I Know", song from the TV series The Little Mermaid
"You Know I Know", song by Saga from their album Marathon
"You Know I Know", song by the Saints from their album Howling